Richard Potenger, of Reading and Compton, Berkshire, (c.1690–1739) was a British lawyer and politician who sat in the House of Commons from 1727 to 1739.

Potenger was the eldest son of Nicholas Potenger of Pangbourne, Berkshire, and the Inner Temple. He was admitted at Inner Temple in 1704  and matriculated at Trinity College, Oxford on 20 October 1705, aged 15. In 1711 he was called to the bar. He married Anne Mason in April 1714. He came into the family properties of  Maidenhatch, in Pangbourne, and in Compton.

Potenger was appointed Recorder of Reading in 1720 and he held the role for the rest of his life. At the 1727 British general election, he was returned after a contest  as Member of Parliament for Reading. He voted with the Administration on the Hessians in 1730 and on the army in 1732, but against on the Excise Bill in 1733. He was returned in a contest at the 1734 British general election. In 1735 he was appointed 2nd Justice of Chester, and was returned again for Reading without a contest at the ensuing by-election.

Potenger died on 26 November 1739 leaving one son.

References

1690s births
1739 deaths
Members of the Parliament of Great Britain for English constituencies
British MPs 1727–1734
British MPs 1734–1741